"Tonight" is the second single from the album It Doesn't Matter by the group The Underdog Project. The single is similar to their first hit "Summer Jam", from the same album. There are various mixes of the song, including a 2-step garage mix (OMO Remix) and a Eurodance mix (Dance Movement Remix). The single was also well received in Europe, although it didn't have much airplay in the US or UK.

Track listing

Europe CD Maxi single
 "Tonight"  – 3:14
 "Tonight"  – 3:14
 "Tonight"  – 4:05
 "Tonight"  – 4:19
 "Tonight"  – 3:31

Canada CD Maxi single (Also Featuring Summer Jam)
 "Tonight"  – 3:19
 "Tonight"  – 3:14
 "Tonight"  – 4:07
 "Tonight"  – 4:21
 "Summer Jam"  – 3:35
 "Summer Jam"  – 4:36
 "Summer Jam"  – 3:48
 "Summer Jam"  – 6:03
 "Summer Jam"  – 6:33

Italy CD Maxi single
 "Tonight"  – 3:14
 "Tonight"  – 3:33
 "Tonight"  – 5:04
 "Tonight"  – 4:47

Netherlands CD single
 "Tonight"  – 3:14
 "Tonight"  – 4:05

US CD Maxi single
 "Tonight"  – 3:14
 "Tonight"  – 3:33
 "Tonight"  – 3:14
 "Tonight"  – 4:05
 "Tonight"  – 4:47
 "Tonight"  – 5:04

Germany vinyl single
 "Tonight"  – 4:19
 "Tonight"  – 4:19
 "Tonight"  – 4:05
 "Tonight"  – 3:14

US vinyl single
 "Tonight"  – 4:19
 "Tonight"  – 3:14
 "Tonight"  – 4:05
 "Tonight"  – 5:04
 "Tonight"  – 4:47
 "Tonight"  – 3:31

Music and lyrics: Toni Cottura, Stephan Browarczyk, Shahin Moshirian, Christoph Brüx, N.C. Thanh, Vick Krishna, Craig Smart

External links
 Tonight Lyrics

References

2000 songs
The Underdog Project songs
PolyGram singles
2000 singles
Songs written by Toni Cottura
Songs written by Christoph Brüx